Mohamed Asswai Khalifa (born 1944) is a Libyan hurdler. He competed in the men's 400 metres hurdles at the 1968 Summer Olympics.

References

1944 births
Living people
Athletes (track and field) at the 1968 Summer Olympics
Libyan male hurdlers
Olympic athletes of Libya
Place of birth missing (living people)